Sir Ken Robinson (4 March 1950 – 21 August 2020) was a British author, speaker and international advisor on education in the arts to government, non-profits, education and arts bodies. He was director of the Arts in Schools Project (1985–1989) and Professor of Arts Education at the University of Warwick (1989–2001), and Professor Emeritus after leaving the university. In 2003, he was knighted for services to the arts.

Originally from a working class Liverpool family, around September 2001 Robinson moved to Los Angeles with his wife and children to serve as Senior Advisor to the president of the J. Paul Getty Trust.

Early life and education
Born in Liverpool, to James and Ethel Robinson, he was one of seven children from a working-class background. One of his brothers, Neil, became a professional footballer for Everton, Swansea City and Grimsby Town. After an industrial accident, his father became quadriplegic. Robinson contracted polio at age four and spent 8 months in hospital. He attended Margaret Beavan Special School due to the physical effects of polio, then Liverpool Collegiate School (1961–1963) and Wade Deacon Grammar School, Cheshire (1963–1968). He then studied English and drama (Bachelor of Education – BEd) at Bretton Hall College of Education (1968–1972) and completed a PhD in 1981 at the University of London, researching drama and theatre in education.

Career and research
From 1985 to 1988, Robinson was director of the Arts in Schools Project, an initiative to develop the arts education throughout England and Wales. The project worked with over 2,000 teachers, artists and administrators in a network of over 300 initiatives and influenced the formulation of the National Curriculum for England. During this period, Robinson chaired Artswork, the UK's national youth arts development agency, and worked as advisor to the Hong Kong Academy for Performing Arts.

For twelve years, he was professor of education at the University of Warwick, and became professor emeritus. He has received honorary degrees from the Rhode Island School of Design, Ringling College of Art and Design, the Open University and the Central School of Speech and Drama, Birmingham City University and the Liverpool Institute for Performing Arts. He received the Athena Award of the Rhode Island School of Design for services to the arts and education, the Peabody Medal for contributions to the arts and culture in the United States, the LEGO Prize for international achievement in education, and the Benjamin Franklin Medal of the Royal Society of Arts for contributions to cultural relations between the United Kingdom and the United States. In 2005, he was named as one of Time/Fortune/CNN's "Principal Voices". In 2003, he was made a Knight Bachelor for his services to the arts.

In 1998, he led a UK commission on creativity, education and the economy and his report, All Our Futures: Creativity, Culture and Education, was influential. The Times said of it: "This report raises some of the most important issues facing business in the 21st century. It should have every CEO and human resources director thumping the table and demanding action". Robinson is credited with creating a strategy for creative and economic development as part of the Peace Process in Northern Ireland, publishing Unlocking Creativity, a plan implemented across the region and mentoring to the Oklahoma Creativity Project. In 1998, he chaired the National Advisory Committee on Creative and Cultural Education.

In 2001, Robinson was appointed senior advisor for education and creativity at the Getty Museum in Los Angeles, which lasted at least until 2005.

Robinson gave three TED talks on the importance of creativity in education, viewed  over 80 million times (2017). At the time of his death in August 2020, his presentation "Do schools kill creativity?" was the most watched TED talk of all time, with 66.3 million views on the TED channel and millions more on YouTube. It has been translated into 62 languages. In April 2013, he gave a talk titled "How to escape education's death valley", in which he outlines three principles crucial for the human mind to flourish – and how current American education culture works against them. In 2010, the Royal Society of Arts animated one of Robinson's speeches about changing education paradigms. The video was viewed nearly half a million times in its first week on YouTube and as of December 2017 has been viewed more than 15 million times.

Ideas on education
Robinson suggested that to engage and succeed, education has to develop on three fronts. Firstly, that it should foster diversity by offering a broad curriculum and encourage individualisation of the learning process. Secondly, it should promote curiosity through creative teaching, which depends on high quality teacher training and development. Finally, it should focus on awakening creativity through alternative didactic processes that put less emphasis on standardised testing, thereby giving the responsibility for defining the course of education to individual schools and teachers. He believed that much of the present education system in the United States encourages conformity, compliance and standardisation rather than creative approaches to learning. Robinson emphasised that we can only succeed if we recognise that education is an organic system, not a mechanical one: successful school administration is a matter of engendering a helpful climate rather than "command and control".

Writing
Learning Through Drama: Report of the Schools Council Drama Teaching (1977) was the result of a three-year national development project for the UK Schools Council. Robinson was principal author of The Arts in Schools: Principles, Practice, and Provision (1982), now a key text on arts and education internationally. He edited The Arts and Higher Education, (1984) and co-wrote The Arts in Further Education (1986), Arts Education in Europe, and Facing the Future: The Arts and Education in Hong Kong.

Robinson's 2001 book, Out of Our Minds: Learning to be Creative (Wiley-Capstone), was described by Director magazine as "a truly mind-opening analysis of why we don't get the best out of people at a time of punishing change." John Cleese said of it: "Ken Robinson writes brilliantly about the different ways in which creativity is undervalued and ignored in Western culture and especially in our educational systems."

The Element: How Finding Your Passion Changes Everything, was published in January 2009 by Penguin. "The element" refers to the experience of personal talent meeting personal passion. He argues that in this encounter, we feel most ourselves, most inspired, and achieve to our highest level. The book draws on the stories of creative artists such as Paul McCartney, The Simpsons creator Matt Groening, Meg Ryan, and physicist Richard Feynman to investigate this paradigm of success.

Publications
 1977 Learning Through Drama: Report of The Schools Council Drama Teaching Project with Lynn McGregor and Maggie Tate. UCL. Heinemann. 
 1980 Exploring Theatre and Education Heinemann 
 1982 The Arts in Schools: Principles, Practice, and Provision, Calouste Gulbenkian Foundation. 
 1984 The Arts and Higher Education. (editor with Christopher Ball). Gulbenkian and the Leverhulme Trust 
 1986 The Arts in Further Education. Department of Education and Science.
 1998 Facing the Future: The Arts and Education in Hong Kong, Hong Kong Arts Development Council ASIN B002MXG93U
 1998 All Our Futures: Creativity, Culture, and Education (The Robinson Report). 
 2001 Out of Our Minds: Learning to Be Creative. Capstone. 
 
 
 
 Robinson, Ken (2018). You, your child, and school : navigate your way to the best education

Awards and honours 
2003 Knighted for his life's work.
2004 Companionship of Liverpool Institute for Performing Arts
2008 Governor's Award for the Arts in Pennsylvania
2008 Gheens Foundation Creativity and Entrepreneurship Award
2008 George Peabody Medal
2008 Benjamin Franklin Medal from the Royal Society of Arts
2008 Honorary Degree from Birmingham City University
2009 Honorary Doctor of Fine Arts from the Rhode Island School of Design (RISD)
2011 Gordon Parks Award for Achievements in Education
 2012 Arthur C. Clarke Imagination Award
2012 Honorary Doctor of Humane Letters from Oklahoma State University
 Honorary Fellow of the Central School of Speech and Drama

Personal life
In 1977, Robinson met Marie-Therese "Terry" Watts, while delivering a course in Liverpool. They married in 1982 and had two children, James and Kate.

Robinson died on 21 August 2020, aged 70, at his home in London. According to his daughter, Robinson died of cancer.

References

External links 

 Official website
 
 
 
 In-depth interview on creativity
 Sir Ken Robinson interviewed on Conversations from Penn State
 IMNO Open Source Mentoring interview with Robinson
 Liverpool pupils interview Robinson, 2008
 London students interview Robinson, London International Music Show, 2008
 Podcast interview with DK from MediaSnackers, 2007
 

1950 births
2020 deaths
Academics of the University of Warwick
Alumni of Bretton Hall College
Alumni of the University of Leeds
Alumni of the University of London
British educational theorists
English expatriates in the United States
George Peabody Medal winners
Knights Bachelor
Writers from Liverpool